Gijs Hoetjes, writing under the pseudonym Gijs IJlander (born Alkmaar, 19 May 1947) is a Dutch writer.  He received the Ferdinand Bordewijk Prijs in 1999 for Twee harten op een schotel.

Biography
Gijs IJlander studied English and translating in Amsterdam and debuted in 1988 with the novel De Kapper , for which he was awarded the Geertjan Lubberhuizen Prijs and Anton Wachter Prijs for best debut. The writing of IJlander is quiet and subdued, with strong formulations notice. the themes of his novels are often psychological struggles of his characters.

References
Profile at the Digital library for Dutch literature

External links
website 

1947 births
Living people
Dutch writers
People from Alkmaar
Ferdinand Bordewijk Prize winners